Aryan also spelled Ariyan, Arian, Aryann or Aaryan is a given name and surname that is popular in India and Iran. The name Aryan is derived from the Sanskrit (ārya) meaning "noble, superior, or high-born".

Given name
Arian Hametaj (born 1957), Albanian footballer
Arian Çuliqi (born 1960), Albanian television director and screenwriter
Aryan Parajuli (born 2003), Nep-Canadian Model and engineer
Aryan Kaganof (born 1964), South African film maker, novelist, poet and fine artist
Arian Leviste (born 1970), American electronic music artist, producer, and DJ
Ariyan A. Johnson (born 1976), American actress, director, dancer and choreographer
Aryan Vaid (born 1976), Indian model
Arian Moayed (born 1980), Iranian-born American actor and theater producer
Aaryan Sigdel (born 1981), Nepali Film actor
Aaryan Dinesh Kanagaratnam (born 1981), Sri Lankan music entertainer
Ariyan Arslani (born 1983), American rapper known as Action Bronson
Arian Foster (born 1986), American football player
Aaryan Krishna Menon (born 1986), Indian actor, screenwriter and director
Aryantaj Tajbakhsh (born 1990), English professional footballer
Aryan Pandit (born 1990), Indian actor and model
Aryann Bhowmik (born 1992), Indian actor
Arian Kabashi (born 1996), Kosovan footballer
Arian Kabashi (born 1997), Swedish footballer
Aryan Tari (born 1999), Norwegian chess grandmaster.
Aryan Bora (born 2000), Indian cricketer
Aryan Chopra (born 2001), Indian chess prodigy
Aryan Juyal (born 2001), Indian cricketer
Arian Moreno (born 2003), Venezuelan footballer
Aryan Prajapati (born 2008), Indian child actor
Aryan Rajesh, Indian film actor
Aryann Roy, Indian actor
Arián Iznaga, Cuban Paralympian sprinter

Surname
Praskovia Arian (1864–1949), Russian and Soviet writer and feminist
Ghamar Ariyan (1922–2012), Iranian researcher and author
A. V. Aryan (1924–2007), Indian politician
Marc Aryan (1926–1985), French-Belgian entertainer
Asher Arian (1938–2010), American political scientist
Bruce Arians (born 1952), American football coach and former player
Khadijeh Aryan (born 1954), Iranian Scholar
Jake Arians (born 1978), American football player
Arman Arian (born 1981), Iranian author, novelist and researcher
Pan Parag Ravi Aryan (born 1985), Indian actor
Kartik Aaryan (born 1990), Indian actor

See also
Arya (name)
Ariana (name)

Arian (disambiguation)

References